Avery Plateau is an ice-covered plateau, about  long and rising to about , midway between Loubet Coast and Foyn Coast in Graham Land, Antarctica. It borders Hemimont Plateau on the south and Bruce Plateau on the north. The first sighting of this plateau is not certain, but it was presumably seen in January and February 1909 by members of the French Antarctic Expedition under Jean-Baptiste Charcot from various positions in the Matha Strait. It was surveyed in 1946–47 by the Falkland Islands Dependencies Survey, and named by the UK Antarctic Place-Names Committee (1955) after Captain George Avery, master of the cutter Lively, who, with Captain John Biscoe in the brig Tula, approached this part of the Antarctic Peninsula in February 1832.

Central plateaus of Graham Land
North to south:
 Laclavère Plateau
 Louis Philippe Plateau
 Detroit Plateau
 Herbert Plateau
 Foster Plateau
 Forbidden Plateau
 Bruce Plateau
 Avery Plateau
 Hemimont Plateau

References
 

Plateaus of Antarctica
Landforms of Graham Land
Foyn Coast
Loubet Coast